Dasylabris is a genus of insects belonging to the family Mutillidae.

The species of this genus are found in Eurasia and Africa.

Species

 Dasylabris adversa
 Dasylabris alluaudi
 Dasylabris anna
 Dasylabris antigone
 Dasylabris argentipes
 Dasylabris atrata
 Dasylabris autonoe
 Dasylabris balucka
 Dasylabris bassutorum
 Dasylabris basutorum
 Dasylabris braunsi
 Dasylabris bulawayoensis
 Dasylabris celimene
 Dasylabris danae
 Dasylabris deckeni
 Dasylabris deiopeia
 Dasylabris doriae
 Dasylabris egregia
 Dasylabris filum
 Dasylabris gravis
 Dasylabris grisea
 Dasylabris gussakovskii
 Dasylabris iberica
 Dasylabris inflatua
 Dasylabris intermedia
 Dasylabris juxtarenaria
 Dasylabris kandla
 Dasylabris kraciva
 Dasylabris lobifera
 Dasylabris lugubris
 Dasylabris makanga
 Dasylabris mandersternii
 Dasylabris manderstiernii
 Dasylabris mashuna
 Dasylabris matiesa
 Dasylabris matiese
 Dasylabris maura
 Dasylabris melicerta
 Dasylabris mephitidiformis
 Dasylabris mephitis
 Dasylabris merope
 Dasylabris miogramma
 Dasylabris mongolica
 Dasylabris namaquana
 Dasylabris phrygia
 Dasylabris regalis
 Dasylabris rugosa
 Dasylabris saga
 Dasylabris schultzeit - orange velvet ant
 Dasylabris siberica
 Dasylabris stimulatrix
 Dasylabris terpsichore
 Dasylabris thais
 Dasylabris unipunctata
 Dasylabris vittata
 Dasylabris voeltzkowi
 Dasylabris zimini

References

Mutillidae
Hymenoptera genera